Humboldt Institute for Interdisciplinary Marijuana Research (HIIMR) is an organization located at California State Polytechnic University, Humboldt whose focus is to analyse and research marijuana issues in Humboldt County, California. HIIMR was officially established as a marijuana research institute in 2012, during a time of evolving laws and perceptions of marijuana. HIIMR is intended to be a statewide center of policy and research on marijuana, providing information and expertise for policy makers, health care and medical professionals, business and the media. 

The institute emphasizes "analysis, not advocacy," stating that they take no stance on legalization or decriminalization of Marijuana.  No classes or training are offered at HIIMR. The institute's mission is to share information, contribute research to public policy debated and to help broaden community and national understanding.

As of 2022, the co-directors of the Institute were Dr. Whitney Ogle and Dr. Dominic Corva. The Institute hosts outside speakers and lecturers discussing issues related to marijuana and cannabis in public policy, business, and recreation.

Publications
Publications
 Swartz, R. (2010). Medical marijuana users in substance abuse treatment. Harm Reduction Journal, 7(3)
 Gold Gregg J. and AT Nguyen (2009) Comparing entering freshmen's perceptions of campus marijuana and alcohol use to reported use. Journal of Drug Education. 39(2):133-48.
 Humboldt State University Library Special Collection on Marijuana Research

Video
 Video titled Ecological Impacts of Industrial Marijuana Operations of grow sites by Prof. Anthony Silvaggio and his students.
 Documentary titled Dispensing Cannabis: The California Story : Voices from Inside by Prof. Ann Alter and B. Shaw and S. Spain.
 For streaming videos from the Speaker Series and symposia, visit the News and Events page and Humboldt Digital Scholar.

Graduate theses
 August, Karen D. (2012) Playing the game: marijuana growing in a rural community.
 Bryant, Samantha M. (2011) Public policy assessment of local government approaches to implementing California's medical marijuana laws.
 Haskell, John Edward (2008) A Bird's Eye View: Medical Marijuana - The Patient's Perspective.
 Owen, Anna C. (2012) Industrial and nutritional hemp In Manitoba: A case study exploring stakeholder strategies and legitimacy.
 Trujillo, Colin William (2011) Marijuana, Mexico and the media.

Journals
 Call for paper submissions to the Humboldt Journal of Social Relations.

Current research
 Eschker, Erick. "Monthly Measure of Marijuana Production"
 Eschker, Erick and Joshua Meisel. "Determinants of College Student Marijuana Production"
 Gold, Gregg J. and S.L. Lee. "How Pre-College Perceptions of Alcohol and Marijuana Use Affect Actual College Use".
 Plume, Jason (2012). Cultivating Reform: Nixon's Illicit Substance Control Legacy, Medical Marijuana Social Movement Organizations and Venue Shopping. PhD dissertation, Syracuse University.
 Plume, Jason. "The Reagan and Bush Drug Years: Path Dependency of the War on Drugs 1981-1993."
 Plume, Jason. "Looking Away toward Reform: Multiple Coalitions of Medical Marijuana Social Movement Organizations in State Policy Making Institutions." Western Political Science Association presentation March 2013.
 Silvaggio, Anthony. "The Environmental and Human Health Impacts of the Marijuana Industrial Complex."
 Silvaggio, Anthony. "Killer buds: Illegal pesticide use and environmental crimes of the marijuana industry in northern California."
 Silvaggio, Anthony. "Environmental Challenges of Marijuana Agriculture in the Age of Prohibition."

References

External links
Benefits Of CBD
CBD FAQs
Balance CBD Website
Effects Of Delta 8 THC Gummies
How To Mix CBD Gummies Into Your Daily Routine

Cannabis research
Educational institutions established in 2012
2012 in cannabis
Cannabis in California
2012 establishments in California
California State Polytechnic University, Humboldt